Re Gulbenkian’s Settlements Trusts [1968]  is an English trusts law case, concerning the certainty of trusts. It held that while the 'is or is not' test was suitable for mere powers, the complete list test remained the appropriate test for discretionary trusts. It was only a year later in McPhail v Doulton that the 'is or is not' test was considered appropriate for discretionary trusts by a different panel of their lordships.

Facts
Calouste Gulbenkian, a wealthy Armenian oil businessman and co-founder of the Iraq Petroleum Company, made a settlement in 1929 that said the trustees should ‘in their absolute discretion’ and while his son Nubar Gulbenkian was still alive, give trust property to 'Nubar Sarkis Gulbenkian and any wife and his children or remoter issue for the time being in existence whether minors or adults and any person or persons in whose house or apartments or in whose company or under whose care or control or by or with whom the said Nubar Sarkis Gulbenkian may from time to time be employed or residing'. It was argued this was too uncertain to be enforced.

Judgment
At first instance, Goff J declared the settlement invalid, following Re Gresham's Settlement where Harman J held a similar clause invalid.

Court of Appeal
The Court of Appeal held that the trust should be declared valid, so long as any claimant could be said to fall within the class at hand. Lord Denning MR said the action was a challenge to Gresham’s case, and continued.

Danckwerts LJ and Winn LJ agreed that the decision should be overturned and held the trust valid.

House of Lords
The House of Lords held for powers of appointment, objects were sufficiently certain if any given individual could be said to be in, or not in, the class. (So this was more relaxed than list certainty, which requires everyone to be said to be in the class.) 
Lord Upjohn reaffirmed the list certainty test for discretionary trusts, but then in McPhail v Doulton, the list certainty test was abandoned for discretionary trusts as well.

Lord Reid said, 'It is often difficult in a particular case to determine whether a temporary sojourn amounts to "residence".' But he held that it was certain enough to succeed.

See also

English trusts law

Notes

References

English trusts case law
1968 in British law
1968 in case law
House of Lords cases